The First Secretary of the Bashkir regional branch of the Communist Party of the Soviet Union was the position of highest authority in the Bashkir ASSR in the Russian SFSR of the Soviet Union. The position was created on November 18, 1919, and abolished in August 1991. The First Secretary was a de facto appointed position usually by the Politburo or the General Secretary himself.

List of First Secretaries of the Bashkir Communist Party

See also
Bashkir Autonomous Soviet Socialist Republic

Notes

Sources
World Statesmen.org

1919 establishments in Russia
1991 disestablishments in the Soviet Union
Regional Committees of the Communist Party of the Soviet Union
Politics of Bashkortostan